Borgh may refer to:

 Borve (disambiguation): places in Scotland named "Borve"
 Tithing: a historical administrative county subdivision which, in the county of Kent, England, is known as a "borgh"

See also
 Berg (disambiguation)
 Burg (disambiguation)
 Borg (disambiguation)
 Bourg (disambiguation)
 Bergh (disambiguation)
 Burgh (disambiguation)